Isaiah is a masculine name of biblical origin. The best known Isaiah is a prophet, in the Book of Isaiah. In Ruthenia, the name Isaiah pervaded from Greek, in the form of Isaija, as well as in the abbreviated form Isaj, which in the fifteenth century was popular in Halic Rus, then connected to Poland for a hundred years.

Notable people named Isaiah

Pre-modern era
Ordered chronologically.
Isaiah of Gaza (died 491), Christian ascetic and monastic writer
Isaiah I of Armenia, Catholicos (head bishop) of Armenia from 775 to 778
Isaiah of Rostov (died 1089 or 1090), Russian Christian missionary, bishop and Russian Orthodox saint
Isaiah di Trani (c. 1180–c. 1250), Italian Talmudist
Isaiah di Trani the Younger, 13th- and 14th-century Italian Talmudist and commentator, grandson of Isaiah di Trani

Modern era
Ordered alphabetically.
Isaiah Balat (1952–2014), Nigerian politician
Isaiah Berlin (1909–1997), British social and political theorist, philosopher and historian of ideas
Isaiah Bowman (1878–1950), American geographer
Isaiah Buggs (born 1997), American football player
Isaiah Coulter (born 1998), American football player
Isaiah Cousins (born 1994), American basketball player in the Israeli Basketball Premier League
Isaiah Crowell (born 1993), American football player
Isaiah Dorman (died 1876), former slave, interpreter for the US Army, and the only African American killed at the Battle of Little Big Horn
Isaiah Dunn (born 1999), American football player
Isaiah Eisendorf (born 1996), American-Israeli basketball player in the Israeli Basketball Premier League
Isaiah Firebrace (born 1999), Australian singer, also known by the mononym Isaiah
Isaiah Ford (born 1996), American football player
Isaiah Foskey (born 2000), American football player
Isaiah Harris (1929–2001), baseball pitcher in the Negro leagues
Isaiah Hart (1792–1861), American plantation owner and founder of Jacksonville, Florida
Isaiah Hodgins (born 1998), American football player
Isaiah Horowitz (c. 1565–1630), Levite rabbi and mystic
Isaiah Jackson (born 1945), African American music conductor
Isaiah Joe (born 1999), American basketball player
Isaiah Johnson (disambiguation), multiple people
Isaiah Kiplangat Koech (born 1993), Kenyan long-distance runner
Isaiah Kopinsky (died 1640), Ukrainian Orthodox metropolitan
Isaiah Langley (born 1996), American football player
Isaiah Likely (born 2000), American football player
Isaiahh Loudermilk (born 1997), American football player
Isaiah Mack (born 1996), American football player
Isaiah McDuffie (born 1999), American football player
Isaiah McGuire (born 2001), American football player
Isaiah McKenzie (born 1995), American football player
Isaiah Miles (born 1994), American basketball player
Isaiah Mobley (born 1999), American basketball player
Isaiah Murphy, (born 1998), Japanese basketball player
Isaiah Mustafa (born 1974), American actor best known for appearing in Old Spice commercials
Isaiah Oggins (1898–1947), American communist spy for the Soviet Union
Isaiah Oliver (born 1996), American football player
Isaiah Osbourne (born 1976), English footballer
Isaiah Philmore (born 1989), German basketball player
Isaiah Pillars (1833–1895), American lawyer, member of the Ohio House of Representatives, and Ohio Attorney General
Isaiah Pola-Mao (born 1999), American football player
Isaiah Prince (born 1997), American football player
Isaiah Rankin (born 1978), English football forward
Isaiah Rider (born 1971), American basketball player
Isaiah Roby (born 1998), American basketball player
Isaiah Rodgers (born 1997), American football player
Isaiah Rogers (1800–1869), American architect
Isaiah Rynders (1804–1885), American businessman, sportsman, underworld figure and political organizer for the notorious Tammany Hall political machine
Isaiah Simmons (born 1998), American football player
Isaiah Spiller (born 2001), American football player
Isaiah Stewart (born 2001), American basketball player
Isaiah Stillman (1793–1861), Illinois militia officer involved in the Black Hawk War
Isaiah Swann (born 1985), American basketball player
Isaiah Taylor (born 1994), American basketball player in the Israeli Basketball Premier League
Isaiah Thomas (disambiguation), multiple people
Isaiah Toothtaker (born 1981), American rapper
Isaiah Washington (born 1963), American actor
Isaiah Whitehead (born 1995), American basketball player
Isaiah Wilkerson (born 1990), American basketball player
Isaiah Wilson (disambiguation), multiple people
Isaiah Wong (born 2001), American basketball player
Isaiah Wright (born 1997), American football player
Isaiah Wynn (born 1996), American football player
Isaiah Zuber (born 1997), American football player

Fictional characters
Isaiah Bradley, Marvel Comics character
Isaiah Crockett (comics), DC Comics superhero
Isaiah Richards "Lewins", the titular character of the 1995 drama movie Losing Isaiah

See also
Isaiah (disambiguation)
Isaias (given name)
Isaia (name)
Short forms:
Ike (given name)
Izzy

Hebrew-language given names
Modern names of Hebrew origin
English masculine given names